General elections were held in the Netherlands on 15 May 1963. The Catholic People's Party (KVP) remained the largest party, winning 50 of the 150 seats in the House of Representatives.

The elections led to a four-party coalition government initially consisting of the KVP, People's Party for Freedom and Democracy, Anti-Revolutionary Party (ARP) and Christian Historical Union. In 1965 this coalition was replaced by one consisting of the KVP, Labour Party and ARP.

Results

References

General elections in the Netherlands
1963 elections in the Netherlands
Netherlands